New Castle Township is a township in Schuylkill County, Pennsylvania, United States, in the state's Coal Region. The population was 348 at the 2020 census.

History
Named for the famous coal city Newcastle upon Tyne in England, the area contains large veins of anthracite coal and has a long history of coal mining; strip mining continues there to the present day.  The area comprising New Castle Township was first settled by Europeans around 1800.  The township was formed in 1847 from part of Norwegian Township.

Geography
According to the United States Census Bureau, the township has a total area of 12.4 square miles (32.2 km2), of which 12.2 square miles (31.6 km2)  is land and 0.2 square mile (0.5 km2)  (1.61%) is water.

Demographics

At the 2000 census there were 395 people, 180 households, and 113 families living in the township.  The population density was 32.3 people per square mile (12.5/km2).  There were 202 housing units at an average density of 16.5/sq mi (6.4/km2).  The racial makeup of the township was 99.24% White, 0.25% African American and 0.51% Asian. Hispanic or Latino of any race were 0.25%.

Of the 180 households 21.1% had children under the age of 18 living with them, 41.7% were married couples living together, 12.8% had a female householder with no husband present, and 37.2% were non-families. 33.9% of households were one person and 20.0% were one person aged 65 or older.  The average household size was 2.19 and the average family size was 2.76.

The age distribution was 17.2% under the age of 18, 5.1% from 18 to 24, 26.3% from 25 to 44, 25.6% from 45 to 64, and 25.8% 65 or older.  The median age was 46 years. For every 100 females there were 98.5 males.  For every 100 females age 18 and over, there were 98.2 males.

The median household income was $24,583 and the median family income  was $32,917. Males had a median income of $29,167 versus $23,125 for females. The per capita income for the township was $14,716.  About 5.5% of families and 6.0% of the population were below the poverty line, including 3.5% of those under age 18 and 5.9% of those age 65 or over.

Gallery

References

Townships in Schuylkill County, Pennsylvania